Loreto is Peru's northernmost department and region. Covering almost one-third of Peru's territory, Loreto is by far the nation's largest department; it is also one of the most sparsely populated regions due to its remote location in the Amazon Rainforest. Its capital is Iquitos.

Geography

 Northwest: Ecuador: Sucumbíos Province, Orellana Province, Pastaza Province and Morona-Santiago Province
 North: Colombia: Putumayo Department
 Northeast: Colombia: Amazonas Department
 East: Brazil: Amazonas State and Acre State
 South: Ucayali and Huánuco regions
 West: San Martín and Amazonas regions

Loreto's large territory comprises parts of the High and Low Jungle, and is largely covered with thick vegetation.

This territory has wide river flood plains, which are covered with rainwater and usually are swamped in summer. In these flood areas there are elevated sectors called restingas, which always remain above water, even in times of the greatest swellings. There are numerous lagoons known as cochas and tipishcas, surrounded by marshy areas with abundant grass vegetation.

Numerous rivers cross Loreto's territory, all of which are part of the Amazonian Hydrographical System. Most of them are navigable. The main river crossing the region is the Amazon, one of the world's most important rivers. Its numerous curves are always changing and sometimes make for a difficult journey. The width between banks of the Amazon sometimes measures a staggering . The Yavari River runs from Peru to Brazil, the Putumayo River serves as part of the border with Colombia, and the Ucayali and Marañón rivers penetrate Loreto after going through the Pongo de Manseriche.

Climate

The average humidity level is 84%, with strong rain all year round.

Administrative divisions
The region is divided into eight provinces (provincias, singular: provincia), which are composed of 53 districts (distritos, singular: distrito). The provinces, with their capitals in parenthesis, are:

 Alto Amazonas (Yurimaguas)
 Datem del Marañón (San Lorenzo)
 Loreto (Nauta)
 Mariscal Ramón Castilla (Caballococha)
 Maynas (Iquitos)
 Requena (Requena)
 Ucayali (Contamana)
 Putumayo (San Antonio del Estrecho)

History

The first settlers in the region expanded through the various eastern slopes of the Andes. Many of these ethnic groups settled in the Purús, Turúa and Yaraví river basins, receiving names different from those of their lineage.

It is hard to determine the number of indigenous peoples in the region when the first European explorers and missionaries arrived. Numbers given by chroniclers indicate that within the first century of contact, 100,000 natives were baptized. Presumably, when the Spanish arrived, the total population was almost 300,000. Later on, however, the natives were afflicted with diseases such as smallpox, malaria, and yellow fever, due to contact with the Spaniards.

On February 12, 1542, and after a search of several months, Spanish conqueror Francisco de Orellana discovered the Amazon river, an adventure that began in the Sierra.

Even though colonization had started several decades before, the city of Iquitos was founded in the 1750s. It is located between the Nanay River and the left bank of the Amazon river, which makes it an ideal starting point when traveling to surrounding regions.

During Colonial times, the Jesuits and Franciscans evangelized and founded different towns. During these years, they contributed by opening travel routes and cutting down distances between indigenous groups and colonial villages.

When the missions fell, a long period of relative national neglect followed, encompassing most of the 19th century. Nonetheless, this was the time when the foundations of the future political organization were laid. Also, this was the beginning of navigation via steamboats, the rubber heyday, and foreign immigration.

The Golden Age of Iquitos started at the end of the 19th century with the rubber boom. Since the region was very rich in rubber and it became so expensive, it turned into the center of attention and ambitions in the world. This period lasted 25 years and left behind gigantic development once the rubber boom had passed.

In 1853, the Littoral Province of Loreto was established, comprising today's departments of Ucayali, San Martín, and parts of Ecuador and Colombia.

Demographics 
Loreto is home to many Amazonian indigenous peoples such as the Amhuacas and the Urarina.

Languages 
According to the 2007 Peru Census, the mother tongue of most of the residents was Spanish (92.51%). The following table shows the mother tongue of the people of the Loreto Region by province:

Culture

Festivities
 First week of January. Anniversary of Iquitos. Week-long festivities to celebrate the founding of the city.
 Third week of February. Carnivals.
 June 24. Fiesta de San Juan. The local people go to the Nanay and Amazonas river banks, taking with them the traditional juanes, cooked on the eve. In front of the waters, they merrily drink and dance.
 First two weeks of August.
 September 7. Señora de la Natividad. Date in which the Tamshiyacu people, in the province of Maynas, honor their patron.
 December 8.

Typical dishes and beverages
The typical dishes in Loreto are very similar to those of other places in the Amazon region. Motelo or turtle meat soup and juanes (rice tamales with chicken or fish) are typical Loretan dishes. Vendors in the local markets offer fried or steamed monkey or lizard meat considered delicious according to the local people.

Other typical dishes include, cecina (dried and smoked pork), tacacho (coal cooked bananas, pork, and chopped onions), chonta salad, palometa (fish soup), carachama (fish) and paiche (a large fish). Among desserts there is a refreshing aguaje ice cream.

To drink, they serve masato (a beer made of cassava) or natural fruit juices such as aguaje, maracuyá (passion fruit), and cocona (Solanum sessiliflorum).

Places of interest
 Allpahuayo-Mishana National Reserve
 Pucacuro Reserved Zone
 Pacaya-Samiria National Reserve

See also
 Peruvian Amazon
 Iquitos

References

External links
 Peruvian Amazon Research Institute
  Loreto region official website
 videos of the Amazon Hope project in Loreto
 Estadisticas de Poblacion INEI, MINSA, Peru 

 
Regions of Peru
Upper Amazon